Nii Aryee Welbeck (3 October 1976 – 12 November 2014) was Ghanaian professional footballer who played for several clubs in Europe and the Ghana national football team. He was born in Takoradi.

Career 
Welbeck played for Swiss Nationalliga B club FC Winterthur in 1996 and Çanakkale Dardanelspor in the Turkish Süper Lig during the 1996–97 season. He spent the following season with Kallithea F.C. in the Greek second division. Next, he signed with Okwawu United, who 2002 retired.

International 
He was included in the Ghana national football team at the 1996 Summer Olympics, appearing in two matches. Welbeck played several matches for the senior national team, including qualifiers for the 1998 FIFA World Cup.

Coaching career 
Welbeck retired 2002 and signed a contract with Okwawu United in the Management.

Personal life 
Nii Aryee Welbeck is the elder brother of the German footballer Nii Armah Welbeck.

References

External links
 

1976 births
2014 deaths
Ghanaian footballers
Ghana international footballers
FC Winterthur players
Expatriate footballers in Switzerland
Ghanaian expatriate sportspeople in Switzerland
Dardanelspor footballers
Kallithea F.C. players
Expatriate footballers in Greece
Expatriate footballers in Turkey
Swiss Challenge League players
Süper Lig players
Super League Greece 2 players
Footballers at the 1996 Summer Olympics
Olympic footballers of Ghana
Ghanaian expatriate sportspeople in Turkey
Association football defenders